Ksawery Faustyn Ignacy Zakrzewski (15 February 1876 in Wełna [now Goślinowo] – 18 November 1915 in Poznań) was a Polish physician, independence activist, director of Poznań's Polish Gymnastic Society "Falcon", co-editor of biweekly magazine Sokół, co-founder (with Marian Seyda) of magazine Kurier Poznański. According to Bernard Chrzanowski, Zakrzewski was an initiator and co-creator of scouting in Greater Poland. He was one of the main organiser of Polish scouting in the Prussian partition of Poland.

See also
 History of the Scout movement in Poland

1876 births
1915 deaths
People from Gniezno County
National League (Poland) members
People from the Province of Posen
20th-century Polish physicians
Polish Scouts and Guides
Polish social activists of the Prussian partition
Member of the Tomasz Zan Society